Thomas L. Kennedy Secondary School (aka, T. L. Kennedy Secondary School) is a school located in Mississauga, Ontario, that was erected in honour of former Premier of Ontario, Thomas Laird Kennedy. Kennedy had been a longtime resident of Streetsville (now part of Mississauga), where he was Master of the River Park Masonic Lodge. Thomas L. Kennedy Secondary School first opened its doors to approximately four hundred and fifty students in September 1953.

Academics
The premiere of T. L. Kennedy's Leadership Academy was in September 2013. Students apply for this program in grade 8. T.L. Kennedy began a new academic program in 2011 that allows students to obtain a "Specialist High Skills Major" in Business on their Ontario Secondary School diploma.  The school has also started a "Specialist High Skills Major" in Technology from the beginning of the 2012 school year.

Athletics
The school has an extracurricular program, including athletic and sports teams. The school has successful basketball and cricket teams.

Arts
T.L. Kennedy has a music program including clubs such as the TLK Rock Band and the TLK Choir.  Students from all grades participate in these clubs and perform at many school wide and community events.

Drama productions

Special events

September 
 The annual Terry Fox Run has been running since 1983 and as of March 2010, TLK students have cumulatively raised over $234,000.

March 
 Nutrition Month 2014 was celebrated with "The Great Big Crunch", and contests.

April 
 Day of Pink is celebrated annually 
 Annual School Drama Production or M.A.A.D night (produced on alternating years)

May 
 T.L. Kennedy has an annual Asian Heritage Month celebrations which include Asian guest speakers, Asian themed events, workshops and fundraisers.

Feeder schools
 T. L. Kennedy Family Schools 
 Briarwood Public School
 Camilla Road Sr. Public School
 Clifton Public School
 Corsair Public School
 Fairview Public School
 Munden Park Public School
 Silver Creek Public School
 Thornwood Public School
 The Valleys Sr. Public School

Notable students and alumni
 Gil Moore, Juno-winning Musician, Entrepreneur, and Educator

See also
List of high schools in Ontario

References 

Peel District School Board
High schools in Mississauga
Educational institutions established in 1953
1953 establishments in Ontario